The 2012 North Dakota State Bison football team represented North Dakota State University in the 2012 NCAA Division I FCS football season. They were led by tenth-year head coach Craig Bohl and played their home games at the Fargodome in Fargo, North Dakota.  North Dakota State entered the season as the defending NCAA Division I Football and Missouri Valley Football Conference (MVFC) champions. In 2012, the Bison won their second straight MVFC title posting, a 7–1 conference record and 10–1 overall mark in the regular season. In the FCS playoffs they defeated South Dakota State, Wofford, Georgia Southern, and Sam Houston State to finish the season 14–1 and win their second consecutive national title.

Schedule

Ranking movements

Coaching staff

References

North Dakota State
North Dakota State Bison football seasons
NCAA Division I Football Champions
Missouri Valley Football Conference champion seasons
North Dakota State
North Dakota State Bison football